Ari Joseph Magder (May 3, 1983 – April 27, 2012) was a Canadian-born American actor best known for Shining Time Station (1989), Rugged Gold (1994) and Woman on Trial: The Lawrencia Bembenek Story (1993, about Laurie Bembenek, starring Tatum O'Neal).

Early life
Ari Magder was born on May 3, 1983 in Toronto, Ontario, Canada. He started acting in 1989 as Dan Jones when Shining Time Station first aired.

Death
Ari died from complications of pneumonia on April 27, 2012 in Los Angeles, California. He is interred at Sholom Memorial Park.

References

External links

1983 births
2012 deaths
American male film actors
American male television actors
American male child actors
Male actors from Toronto
Deaths from pneumonia in California
20th-century American Jews
21st-century American Jews